Aswalpur is a village in Pindra Tehsil of Varanasi district in the Indian state of Uttar Pradesh. Aswalpur has its own gram panchayat by the same name as the village. The village is about 30 kilometers North-West of Varanasi city, 264 kilometers South-East of state capital Lucknow and 798 kilometers South-East of the national capital Delhi.

Demography
Aswalpur has a total population of 2,080 people amongst 285 families. Sex ratio of Aswalpur is 957 and child sex ratio is 831. Uttar Pradesh state average for both ratios is 912 and 902 respectively .

Transportation
Aswalpur can be accessed by road and does not have a railway station of its own. Closest railway station to this village is Khalispur railway station (9.2 kilometers North-East). Nearest operational airports are Varanasi airport (13 kilometers South-East) and Allahabad Airports (136 kilometers West).

See also

Pindra Tehsil
Pindra (Assembly constituency)

Notes
  All demographic data is based on 2011 Census of India.

References 

Villages in Varanasi district